Imran Ahmed Khan Niazi  (born 5 October 1952) is a Pakistani politician and former cricket captain who served as the 22nd Prime Minister of Pakistan from August 2018 until April 2022, when he was ousted through a no-confidence motion in the National Assembly. He is the founder and chairman of Pakistan Tehreek-e-Insaf (PTI).

Born to a Niazi Pashtun family in Lahore, Khan graduated from Keble College, University of Oxford, England, in 1975. He began his international cricket career at age 18, in a 1971 Test series against England. Khan played until 1992, served as the team's captain intermittently between 1982 and 1992, and won the 1992 Cricket World Cup, in what is Pakistan's first and only victory in the competition. Considered one of cricket's greatest all-rounders, Khan scored 3,807 runs and took 362 wickets in Test cricket and was inducted into the ICC Cricket Hall of Fame. Khan founded cancer hospitals in Lahore and Peshawar, and Namal College in Mianwali, prior to entering politics. Founding the PTI in 1996, Khan won a seat in the National Assembly in the 2002 general election, serving as an opposition member from Mianwali until 2007. PTI boycotted the 2008 general election and became the second-largest party by popular vote in the 2013 general election. In the 2018 general election, running on a populist platform, PTI became the largest party in the National Assembly, and formed a coalition government with independents with Khan as Prime Minister.

As Prime Minister, Khan addressed a balance of payments crisis with bailouts from the International Monetary Fund. He presided over a shrinking current account deficit, and limited defence spending to curtail the fiscal deficit, leading to some general economic growth. He enacted policies that increased tax collection, and investment. His government committed to a renewable energy transition, launched the Ehsaas Programme and the Plant for Pakistan initiative, and expanded the protected areas of Pakistan. He presided over the COVID-19 pandemic, which caused economic turmoil and rising inflation in the country, and threatened his political position. Despite a promised anti-corruption campaign, the perception of corruption in Pakistan worsened during Khan's time in office. He was accused of political victimisation of opponents and clamping down on freedom of expression and dissent.

Amid a constitutional crisis, Khan became the first Prime Minister to be removed from office through a no-confidence motion in April 2022. In August, he was charged under anti-terror laws after accusing the police and judiciary of detaining and torturing an aide. In November, he survived an assassination attempt during a political rally in Wazirabad, Punjab.

Early life and family 

Khan was born in Lahore on 5 October 1952. Some reports suggest he was born on 25 November 1952. It was reported that 25 November was wrongly mentioned by Pakistan Cricket Board officials on his passport. He is the only son of Ikramullah Khan Niazi, a civil engineer, and his wife Shaukat Khanum, and has four sisters. Long settled in Mianwali in northwestern Punjab, his paternal family are of Pashtun ethnicity and belong to the Niazi tribe, and one of his ancestors, Haibat Khan Niazi, in the 16th century, "was one of Sher Shah Suri's leading generals, as well as being the governor of Punjab." Like his father, Khan's mother was an ethnic Pashtun, who belonged to the Burki tribe and whose ancestors had been settled in the Jalandhar district of Punjab for centuries. Following the creation of Pakistan, she migrated to Lahore with the rest of Khan's maternal relatives. Khan's maternal family has produced a number of cricketers, including those who have represented Pakistan, such as his cousins Javed Burki and Majid Khan. Maternally, Khan is also a descendant of the Sufi warrior-poet and inventor of the Pashto alphabet, Pir Roshan, who hailed from his maternal family's ancestral Kaniguram town located in South Waziristan in the tribal areas of northwest Pakistan. His maternal family was based in Basti Danishmanda, Jalandhar, India for about 600 years.

A quiet and shy boy in his youth, Khan grew up with his sisters in relatively affluent, upper middle-class circumstances and received a privileged education. He was educated at the Aitchison College and Cathedral School in Lahore, and then the Royal Grammar School Worcester in England, where he excelled at cricket. In 1972, he enrolled in Keble College, Oxford where he studied Philosophy, Politics and Economics, graduating in 1975. An enthusiast for college cricket at Keble, Paul Hayes, was instrumental in securing the admission of Khan, after he had been turned down by Cambridge.

Cricket career 
Khan made his first-class cricket debut at the age of 16 in Lahore. By the start of the 1970s, he was playing for his home teams of Lahore A (1969–70), Lahore B (1969–70), Lahore Greens (1970–71) and, eventually, Lahore (1970–71). Khan was part of the University of Oxford's Blues Cricket team during the 1973–1975 seasons.

He played English county cricket from 1971 to 1976 for Worcestershire. During this decade, other teams represented by Khan included Dawood Industries (1975–1976) and Pakistan International Airlines (1975–1976 to 1980–1981). From 1983 to 1988, he played for Sussex.

Khan made his Test cricket debut against England in June 1971 at Edgbaston. Three years later, in August 1974, he debuted in the One Day International (ODI) match, once again playing against England at Trent Bridge for the Prudential Trophy. After graduating from Oxford and finishing his tenure at Worcestershire, he returned to Pakistan in 1976 and secured a permanent place on his native national team starting from the 1976–1977 season, during which they faced New Zealand and Australia. Following the Australian series, he toured the West Indies, where he met Tony Greig, who signed him up for Kerry Packer's World Series Cricket. His credentials as one of the fastest bowlers in the world started to become established when he finished third at 139.7 km/h in a fast bowling contest at Perth in 1978, behind Jeff Thomson and Michael Holding, but ahead of Dennis Lillee, Garth Le Roux and Andy Roberts. During the late 1970s, Khan was one of the pioneers of the reverse swing bowling technique. He imparted this trick to the bowling duo of Wasim Akram and Waqar Younis, who mastered and popularised this art in later years.

As a bowler, Khan initially bowled with a relatively chest-on action, at medium-pace. However he worked hard to remodel his action to a more classical type, and to strengthen his body, to enable fast bowling. Khan attained his prime as a fast bowler in January 1980 till 1988 when he became out and out fast bowler. During this span Imran picked 236 test wickets at 17.77 apiece with 18 five-wicket hauls and 5 10 wicket hauls. His bowling average and strike rate were better than Richard Hadlee (19.03), Malcolm Marshall (20.20), Dennis Lillee (24.07), Joel Garner (20.62) and Michael Holding (23.68). In January 1983, playing against India, he attained a Test bowling rating of 922 points. Although calculated retrospectively (International Cricket Council (ICC) player ratings did not exist at the time), Khan's form and performance during this period ranks third in the ICC's All-Time Test Bowling Rankings.

Khan achieved the all-rounder's triple (securing 3000 runs and 300 wickets) in 75 Tests, the second-fastest record behind Ian Botham's 72. He also has the second-highest all-time batting average of 61.86 for a Test batsman playing at position 6 in the batting order. He played his last Test match for Pakistan in January 1992, against Sri Lanka at Faisalabad. Khan retired permanently from cricket six months after his last ODI, the historic 1992 World Cup final against England in Melbourne, Australia. He ended his career with 88 Test matches, 126 innings and scored 3807 runs at an average of 37.69, including six centuries and 18 fifties. His highest score was 136. As a bowler, he took 362 wickets in Test cricket, which made him the first Pakistani and world's fourth bowler to do so. In ODIs, he played 175 matches and scored 3709 runs at an average of 33.41. His highest score was 102 not out. His best ODI bowling was 6 wickets for 14 runs, a record for the best bowling figures by any bowler in an ODI innings in a losing cause.

Captaincy 
At the height of his career, in 1982, the thirty-year-old Khan took over the captaincy of the Pakistan cricket team from Javed Miandad. As a captain, Khan played 48 Test matches, of which 14 were won by Pakistan, 8 lost and the remaining 26 were drawn. He also played 139 ODIs, winning 77, losing 57 and ending one in a tie.

In the team's second match, Khan led them to their first Test win on English soil for 28 years at Lord's. Khan's first year as captain was the peak of his legacy as a fast bowler as well as an all-rounder. He recorded the best Test bowling of his career while taking 8 wickets for 58 runs against Sri Lanka at Lahore in 1981–1982. He also topped both the bowling and batting averages against England in three-Test series in 1982, taking 21 wickets and averaging 56 with the bat. Later the same year, he put up a highly acknowledged performance in a home series against the formidable Indian team by taking 40 wickets in six Tests at an average of 13.95. By the end of this series in 1982–1983, Khan had taken 88 wickets in 13 Test matches over a period of one year as captain. This same Test series against India, however, also resulted in a stress fracture in his shin that kept him out of cricket for more than two years. An experimental treatment funded by the Pakistani government helped him recover by the end of 1984 and he made a successful comeback to international cricket in the latter part of the 1984–1985 season.

In 1987 in India, Khan led Pakistan in its first-ever Test series win and this was followed by Pakistan's first series victory in England during the same year. During the 1980s, his team also recorded three creditable draws against the West Indies. India and Pakistan co-hosted the 1987 Cricket World Cup, but neither ventured beyond the semi-finals. Khan retired from international cricket at the end of the World Cup. In 1988, he was asked to return to the captaincy by the President of Pakistan, General Zia-Ul-Haq, and on 18 January, he announced his decision to rejoin the team. Soon after returning to the captaincy, Khan led Pakistan to another winning tour in the West Indies, which he has recounted as "the last time I really bowled well". He was declared Man of the Series against West Indies in 1988 when he took 23 wickets in 3 Tests. Khan's career-high as a captain and cricketer came when he led Pakistan to victory in the 1992 Cricket World Cup. Playing with a brittle batting line-up, Khan promoted himself as a batsman to play in the top order along with Javed Miandad, but his contribution as a bowler was minimal. At the age of 39, Khan took the winning last wicket himself.

Post-retirement 

After retiring, Khan remarked that there was ball tampering during his early cricketing days when playing domestic cricket.
Khan had said that, during  matches, he "occasionally scratched the side of the ball and lifted the seam." However, Khan defended his actions in the same interview, arguing his conduct was commonplace at the time, even that spin bowlers would lift the seam (i.e. mildly ball tamper), further Khan argued that as he did not lift the seam of the ball above the normal level he was not violating the rules and spirit of the game within the rules defined whilst he was a player. Further, Khan argued that umpires in his 21 years of cricket had not complained about his conduct, Khan remarked that "The sole judge of fair and unfair play on the cricket field is the umpire".
He had also added, "Only once did I use an object. When Sussex was playing Hampshire in 1981 the ball was not deviating at all. I got the 12th man to bring out a bottle top and it started to move around a lot." In 1996, Khan successfully defended himself in a libel action brought forth by former English captain and all-rounder Ian Botham and batsman Allan Lamb over comments they alleged were made by Khan in two articles about the above-mentioned ball-tampering and another article published in an Indian magazine, India Today. They claimed that, in the latter publication, Khan had called the two cricketers "racist, ill-educated and lacking in class."  Khan protested that he had been misquoted, saying that he was defending himself after having admitted that he tampered with a ball in a county match 18 years ago. Khan won the libel case, which the judge labelled a "complete exercise in futility", with a 10–2 majority decision by the jury. Also, Khan had served as a domestic league coach.

Since retiring, Khan has written opinion pieces on cricket for various British and Asian newspapers, especially regarding the Pakistani national team.  His contributions have been published in India's Outlook magazine, Guardian, The Independent, and Telegraph. Khan also sometimes appears as a cricket commentator on Asian and British sports networks, including BBC Urdu and the Star TV network. In 2004, when the Indian cricket team toured Pakistan after 14 years, he was a commentator on TEN Sports' special live show, Straight Drive, while he was also a columnist for sify.com for the 2005 India-Pakistan Test series. He has provided analysis for every cricket World Cup since 1992, which includes providing match summaries for the BBC during the 1999 World Cup.
He holds as a captain the world record for taking most wickets, best bowling strike rate and best bowling average in Test,
and best bowling figures (8 wickets for 60 runs) in a Test innings,
and also most five-wicket hauls (6) in a Test innings in wins.

On 23 November 2005, Khan was appointed as the chancellor of University of Bradford, succeeding Baroness Lockwood. On 26 February 2014, University of Bradford Union floated a motion to remove Khan from the post over Khan's absence from every graduation ceremony since 2010. Khan, however, announced that he will step down on 30 November 2014, citing his "increasing political commitments". The university vice-chancellor Brian Cantor said Khan had been "a wonderful role model for our students".

Philanthropy 

During the 1990s, Khan also served as UNICEF's Special Representative for Sports and promoted health and immunisation programmes in Bangladesh, Pakistan, Sri Lanka and Thailand. While in London, he also works with the Lord's Taverners, a cricket charity. Khan focused his efforts solely on social work. By 1991, he had founded the Shaukat Khanum Memorial Trust, a charity organisation bearing the name of his mother, Mrs. Shaukat Khanum. As the Trust's maiden endeavour, Khan established Pakistan's first and only cancer hospital, constructed using donations and funds exceeding $25 million, raised by Khan from all over the world.

On 27 April 2008, Khan established a technical college in the Mianwali District called Namal College. It was built by the Mianwali Development Trust (MDT), and is an associate college of the University of Bradford in December 2005. Imran Khan Foundation is another welfare work, which aims to assist needy people all over Pakistan. It has provided help to flood victims in Pakistan. Buksh Foundation has partnered with the Imran Khan Foundation to light up villages in Dera Ghazi Khan, Mianwali and Dera Ismail Khan under the project 'Lighting a Million Lives'. The campaign will establish several Solar Charging Stations in the selected off-grid villages and will provide villagers with solar lanterns, which can be regularly charged at the solar-charging stations.

Political ideology 
Basing his wider paradigm on the poet-philosopher Muhammad Iqbal and the Iranian writer-sociologist Ali Shariati he came across in his youth, Khan is generally described as a nationalist and a populist. Khan's proclaimed political platform and declarations include: Islamic values, to which he rededicated himself in the 1990s; liberal economics, with the promise of deregulating the economy and creating a welfare state; decreased bureaucracy and the implementation of anti-corruption laws, to create and ensure a clean government; the establishment of an independent judiciary; overhaul of the country's police system; and an anti-militant vision for a democratic Pakistan. 
Khan publicly demanded a Pakistani apology towards the Bangladeshi people for the atrocities committed in 1971. He called the 1971 operation a "blunder" and likened it to today's treatment of Pashtuns in the war on terror. However, he repeatedly criticised the war crimes trials in Bangladesh in favour of the convicts. His sympathetic position toward the Pakistani Taliban and Afghan Taliban, as well as his criticism of the US-led war on terror, has earned him the moniker "Taliban Khan" in Pakistani politics. He believes in negotiations with Taliban and the pull out of the Pakistan Army from Federally Administered Tribal Areas (FATA). He is against US drone strikes and plans to disengage Pakistan from the US-led war on terror. Khan also opposes almost all military operations, including the Siege of Lal Masjid.

In 2010, Khan said in an interview: "I grew up hating India because I grew up in Lahore and there were massacres of 1947, so much bloodshed and anger. But as I started touring India, I got such love and friendship there that all this disappeared."

In August 2012, the Pakistani Taliban issued death threats if he went ahead with his march to their tribal stronghold along the Afghan border to protest US drone attacks, because he calls himself a "liberal" – a term they associate with a lack of religious belief. On 1 October 2012, prior to his plan to address a rally in South Waziristan, senior commanders of Pakistani Taliban said after a meeting headed by the Taliban leader Hakimullah Mehsud that they now offered Khan security assistance for the rally because of Khan's opposition to drone attacks in Pakistan, reversing their previous stance.

In 2014, when Pakistani Taliban announced armed struggle against Ismaili Muslims (denouncing them as non-Muslims) and the Kalash people, Khan released a statement describing "forced conversions as un-Islamic". He has also condemned the incidents of forced conversion of Hindu girls in Sindh. Khan views the Kashmir issue as a humanitarian issue, as opposed to a territorial dispute between two countries (India and Pakistan). He also proposed secret talks to settle the issue as he thinks the vested interests on both sides will try to subvert them. He ruled out a military solution to the conflict and denied the possibility of a fourth war between India and Pakistan over the disputed mountainous region.

On 8 January 2016, Khan visited the embassies of Iran and Saudi Arabia in Islamabad and met their head of commissions to understand their stances about the conflict that engulfed both nations after the execution of Sheikh Nimr by Saudi Arabia. He urged the Government of Pakistan to play a positive role to resolve the matter between both countries. After parliament passed a unanimous resolution keeping Pakistan out of the War in Yemen in April 2015, Khan claimed that his party was responsible for "many critical clauses" of the resolution. In July 2018, the Saudi-based Islamic Development Bank activated its $4.5 billion oil financing facility for Pakistan.

After the result of 2018 Pakistani general election, Imran Khan said he would try to remake Pakistan based on the ideology of Muhammad Ali Jinnah.

During his government, Khan addressed a balance of payments crisis with a bailout from the International Monetary Fund. He presided over a shrinking current account deficit, and limited defence spending to curtail the fiscal deficit, leading to some general economic growth. He enacted policies which increased tax collection and investment, and reforms were made to the social safety net. His government committed to a renewable energy transition, launched a national reforestation initiative and expanded protected areas, and led the country during the COVID-19 pandemic. However, his failure to revive the economy and the rising inflation rate caused him political problems. Despite his promised anti-corruption campaign, the perception of corruption in Pakistan worsened during his rule. He was accused of political victimisation of opponents and clamping down on freedom of expression and dissent.

In foreign relations, he dealt with border skirmishes against India and strengthened relations with China and Russia, while relations with the United States cooled. Following the Taliban takeover of Kabul in 2021, Khan congratulated the Taliban for their victory in the 2001–2021 war, and urged the international community to support their new government.  He also said that his government was negotiating a peace deal with the  Pakistani Taliban (TTP) with the help of the Afghan Taliban. On 10 April 2022, Khan became the country's first prime minister to be ousted through a no-confidence motion vote in parliament. On 22 August 2022, Khan was charged by the Pakistani police under anti-terror laws after Khan accused the police and judiciary of detaining and torturing his close aide.

Political career

Initial years 

Khan was offered political positions more than a few times during his cricketing career. In 1987, then-President Muhammad Zia-ul-Haq offered him a political position in Pakistan Muslim League (PML) which he declined. He was also invited by Nawaz Sharif to join his political party.

In 1993, Khan was appointed as the ambassador for tourism in the caretaker government of Moeen Qureshi and held the portfolio for three months until the government dissolved.

On 25 April 1996, Khan founded a political party, Pakistan Tehreek-e-Insaf (PTI). He ran for the seat of National Assembly of Pakistan in 1997 Pakistani general election as a candidate of PTI from two constituencies – NA-53, Mianwali and NA-94, Lahore – but was unsuccessful and lost both the seats to candidates of PML (N).

Khan supported General Pervez Musharraf's military coup in 1999, believing Musharraf would "end corruption, clear out the political mafias". According to Khan, he was Musharraf's choice for prime minister in 2002 but turned down the offer. Khan participated in the October 2002 Pakistani general election that took place across 272 constituencies and was prepared to form a coalition if his party did not get a majority of the vote. He was elected from Mianwali. In the 2002 referendum, Khan supported military dictator General Musharraf, while all mainstream democratic parties declared that referendum as unconstitutional. He has also served as a part of the Standing Committees on Kashmir and Public Accounts. On 6 May 2005, Khan was mentioned in The New Yorker as being the "most directly responsible" for drawing attention in the Muslim world to the Newsweek story about the alleged desecration of the Qur'an in a U.S. military prison at the Guantánamo Bay Naval Base in Cuba. In June 2007, Khan faced political opponents in and outside the parliament.

On 2 October 2007, as part of the All Parties Democratic Movement, Khan joined 85 other MPs to resign from Parliament in protest of the presidential election scheduled for 6 October, which general Musharraf was contesting without resigning as army chief. On 3 November 2007, Khan was put under house arrest, after president Musharraf declared a state of emergency in Pakistan. Later Khan escaped and went into hiding. He eventually came out of hiding on 14 November to join a student protest at the University of the Punjab. At the rally, Khan was captured by student activists from the Islami Jamiat-e-Talaba and roughly treated. He was arrested during the protest and was sent to the Dera Ghazi Khan jail in the Punjab province where he spent a few days before being released.

On 30 October 2011, Khan addressed more than 100,000 supporters in Lahore, challenging the policies of the government, calling that new change a "tsunami" against the ruling parties, Another successful public gathering of hundreds of thousands of supporters was held in Karachi on 25 December 2011. Since then Khan became a real threat to the ruling parties and a future political prospect in Pakistan. According to an International Republican Institute's survey, Khan's Pakistan Tehreek-e-Insaf tops the list of popular parties in Pakistan both at the national and provincial level.

On 6 October 2012, Khan joined a vehicle caravan of protesters from Islamabad to the village of Kotai in Pakistan's South Waziristan region against US drone missile strikes. On 23 March 2013, Khan introduced the Naya Pakistan Resolution (New Pakistan) at the start of his election campaign. On 29 April The Observer termed Khan and his party Pakistan Tehreek-e-Insaf as the main opposition to the Pakistan Muslim League-Nawaz. Between 2011 and 2013, Khan and Nawaz Sharif began to engage each other in a bitter feud. The rivalry between the two leaders grew in late 2011 when Khan addressed his largest crowd at Minar-e-Pakistan in Lahore. From 26 April 2013, in the run up to the elections, both the PML-N and the PTI started to criticise each other.

2013 elections campaign 

On 21 April 2013, Khan launched his final public relations campaign for the 2013 elections from Lahore, where he addressed thousands of supporters at the Mall. Khan announced that he would pull Pakistan out of the U.S.-led war on terror and bring peace to the Pashtun tribal belt. He addressed different public meetings in various cities of Khyber Pakhtunkhwa and other parts of country, where he announced that PTI will introduce a uniform education system in which the children of rich and poor would have equal opportunities. Khan ended his south Punjab campaign by addressing rallies in various Seraiki belt cities.

Khan ended the campaign by addressing a rally of supporters in Islamabad via a video link while lying on a bed at a hospital in Lahore. The last survey before the elections by The Herald showed 24.98 percent of voters nationally planned to vote for his party, just a whisker behind former prime minister Nawaz Sharif's PML-N. On 7 May, just four days before the elections, Khan was rushed to Shaukat Khanum hospital in Lahore after he tumbled from a forklift at the edge of a stage and fell headfirst to the ground. Pakistan's 2013 elections were held on 11 May 2013 throughout the country. The elections resulted in a clear majority of Pakistan Muslim League (N). Khan's PTI emerged as the second-largest party by popular vote nationally, including in Karachi. Khan's party PTI won 30 directly elected parliamentary seats and became the third-largest party in National Assembly behind Pakistan People's Party, which was second.

In opposition 

Khan led Pakistan Tehreek-e-Insaf became the opposition party in Punjab and Sindh. Khan became the parliamentary leader of his party. On 31 July 2013 Khan was issued a contempt of court notice for allegedly criticising the superior judiciary, and his use of the word shameful for the judiciary. The notice was discharged after Khan submitted before the Supreme Court that he criticised the lower judiciary for their actions during the May 2013 general election while those judicial officers were working as returning officers. Khan's party swooped the militancy-hit northwestern Khyber Pakhtunkhwa, and formed the provincial government. PTI-led Khyber Pakhtunkhwa government presented a balanced, tax-free budget for the fiscal year 2013–14. During his provincial government, Khan was criticised for his support for Sami-ul-Haq, the "Father of the Taliban," and giving funds to his seminary, Darul Uloom Haqqania.

Khan believed that terrorist activities by the Pakistani Taliban could be stopped through dialogue with them and even offered them to open an office in Khyber Pakhtunkhwa. He accused the United States of sabotaging peace efforts with the Pakistani Taliban by killing its leader Hakimullah Mehsud in a drone strike in 2013. He demanded the government to block NATO supply line in retaliation for the killing of the TTP leader.

On 13 November 2013, Khan, being party leader, ordered Pervez Khattak to dismiss ministers of Qaumi Watan Party (QWP) who were allegedly involved in corruption. Bakht Baidar and Ibrar Hussan Kamoli of Qaumi Watan Party, ministers for Manpower & Industry and Forest & Environment respectively, were dismissed. Khan ordered Chief Minister Khyber Pakhtunkhwa to end the alliance with QWP. The Chief Minister also dismissed Minister for Communication and Works of PTI Yousuf Ayub Khan due to a fake degree.

A year after elections, on 11 May 2014, Khan alleged that 2013 general elections were rigged in favour of the ruling PML (N). On 14 August 2014, Imran Khan led a rally of supporters from Lahore to Islamabad, demanding Prime Minister Nawaz Sharif's resignation and investigation into alleged electoral fraud. On its way to the capital Khan's convoy was attacked by stones from PML (N) supporters in Gujranwala; however, there were no fatalities. Khan was reported to be attacked with guns which forced him to travel in a bullet-proof vehicle. On 15 August, Khan-led protesters entered the capital and a few days later marched into the high-security Red Zone; on 1 September 2014, according to Al Jazeera, protesters attempted to storm Prime Minister Nawaz Sharif's official residence, which prompted the outbreak of violence. Three people died and more than 595 people were injured, including 115 police officers. Prior to the violence that resulted in deaths, Khan asked his followers to take law into their own hands.

By September 2014, Khan had entered into a de facto alliance with Canadian-Pakistani cleric Muhammad Tahir-ul-Qadri; both have aimed to mobilise their supporters for regime change. Khan entered into an agreement with the Sharif administration to establish a three-member high-powered judicial commission which would be formed under a presidential ordinance. The commission would make its final report public. If the commission finds a country-wide pattern of rigging proved, the prime minister would dissolve the national and provincial assemblies in terms of the articles 58(1) and 112(1) of the Constitution – thereby meaning that the premier would also appoint the caretaker setup in consultation with the leader of the opposition and fresh elections would be held. He also met Syed Mustafa Kamal, when he was in the opposition.

2018 general election 

Imran Khan contested the general election from NA-35 (Bannu), NA-53 (Islamabad-II), NA-95 (Mianwali-I), NA-131 (Lahore-IX), and NA-243 (Karachi East-II). According to early, official results, Khan led the poll, although his opposition, mainly PML-N, alleged large-scale vote rigging and administrative malpractices. On 27 July, election officials declared that Khan's party had won 110 of the 269 seats, giving PTI a plurality in the National Assembly. At the conclusion of the count on 28 July, the Election Commission of Pakistan (ECP) announced that the PTI had won a total of 116 of the 270 seats contested. Khan became the first person in the history of Pakistan general elections who contested and won in all five constituencies, surpassing Zulfikar Ali Bhutto who contested in four but won in three constituencies in 1970.

In May 2018, Khan's party announced a 100-day agenda for a possible future government. The agenda included sweeping reforms in almost all areas of government including creation of a new province in Southern Punjab, fast tracking of merger of Federally Administered Tribal Areas into Khyber Pakhtunkhwa, betterment of law and order situation in Karachi, and betterment of relations with Baloch political leaders.

Post-2018 election reaction 
A number of opposition parties have alleged "massive rigging" in Khan's favor amid allegations of military interference in the general elections. Nawaz Sharif and his PML-N party, in particular, claimed that a conspiracy between the judiciary and military had influenced the election in favour of Khan and PTI. The Election Commission, however, rejected allegations of rigging and Sharif and his PML-N later conceded victory to Khan, despite lingering 'reservations' regarding the result. Two days after the 2018 general elections were held, the chief observer of the European Union Election Observation Mission to Pakistan Michael Gahler confirmed that the overall situation of the general election was satisfactory.

Victory speech 
During his victory speech, he laid out the policy outlines for his future government. Khan said his inspiration is to build Pakistan as a humanitarian state based on principles of the first Islamic state of Medina. He described that his future government will put the poor and commoners of the country first and all policies will be geared towards elevating the standards of living of the lesser fortunate. He promised an investigation into rigging allegations. He said that he wanted a united Pakistan and would refrain from victimizing his political opponents. Everyone would be equal under the law. He promised a simple and less costly government, devoid of showy pompousness in which the prime minister's house will be converted into an educational institute and governor houses will be used for public benefit.

On foreign policy, he praised China and hoped to have better relations with Afghanistan, United States, and India. On Middle East, he said his government will strive to have a balanced relationship with Saudi Arabia and Iran.

Nominations and appointments 
On 6 August 2018, PTI officially nominated him as the candidate for prime minister. Delivering a speech during his nomination, he said that he will present himself for public accountability for an hour every week in which he will answer questions put forward by masses.

After the election, Khan made some appointments and nominations for national and provincial level public office holders as the head of the winning party. Asad Umar was designated finance minister in the future government of Khan in the center. Khan nominated Imran Ismail for Governor of Sindh, Mahmood Khan as future Chief Minister of Khyber Pakhtunkhwa, Chaudhry Muhammad Sarwar as Governor of Punjab, Asad Qaiser as Speaker of the National Assembly of Pakistan, and Shah Farman as Governor of Khyber Pakhtunkhwa. In Balochistan, his party decided to support Balochistan Awami Party which nominated Jam Kamal Khan for chief minister and former chief minister Abdul Quddus Bizenjo for speaker. His party nominated Pakistan Muslim League (Q) leader and former Deputy Prime Minister of Pakistan, Pervaiz Elahi for the slot of Speaker of the Punjab Assembly. Abdul Razak Dawood was nominated to be the advisor to prime minister on economic affairs. Qasim Khan Suri was nominated for deputy speaker of national assembly slot. Mushtaq Ahmed Ghani and Mehmood Jan were nominated as speaker and deputy speaker of Khyber Pakhtunkhwa assembly respectively. Dost Muhammad Mazari was nominated as Deputy Speaker for the Provincial Assembly of Punjab. Khan nominated Sardar Usman Buzdar for Chief Minister of Punjab. Announcing the nomination, Khan said that he chose Buzdar because he belongs to the most backward area of Punjab. According to some sources, Buzdar was nominated as a makeshift arrangement because it will be easier to remove a lesser-known individual when Shah Mahmood Qureshi is ready to become chief minister.

Prime Minister of Pakistan

First 100 days 

On 17 August 2018, Khan secured 176 votes and became 22nd Prime Minister of Pakistan and took oath of office on 18 August 2018. Khan ordered top level reshuffling in the country's bureaucracy, including the appointment of Sohail Mahmood as Foreign Secretary, Rizwan Ahmed as Maritime Secretary and Naveed Kamran Baloch as Finance Secretary. His first major appointment in the Pakistan Army was that of Lieutenant General Asim Munir to the key slot of Director-General of Inter-Services Intelligence.

Khan announced his cabinet soon after taking oath, choosing to keep the Ministry of Interior to himself. Though he later appointed Ijaz Ahmed Shah as interior minister. Many of his appointees were previously ministers during Musharraf era, although some were defectors from the left-wing People's Party. In 2019 Khan committed to a major cabinet reshuffle in the ministries of interior, finance, information and planning.

Khan stated that despite the assassination of Saudi journalist Jamal Khashoggi, Pakistan must prioritize good relations with Saudi Arabia due to an economic crisis. He also added that U.S. sanctions against Iran are affecting neighboring Pakistan, stating "The last thing the Muslim World needs is another conflict. The Trump administration is moving towards that direction." Khan has prioritised close ties with China, saying he "did not know" much about concentration camps for China's Muslims. Though Khan confirmed he had raised the matter "privately" in discussions with China.

Khan was named one of Time magazine's 100 Most Influential People of 2019.

Economic policy 
In domestic economic policy, Khan inherited a twin balance of payments and debt crisis with a large current account deficit and fiscal deficit in 2018, Khan's government sought a bailout from the IMF. In exchange for the bailout, Khan's government slashed subsidy spending in the energy sector and unveiled an austerity budget to curb the fiscal deficit and limit government borrowing. Also, the IMF demanded that the Pakistani government depreciate the rupee, and improve tax collection. Khan's government decided to raise import tariffs to collect higher tax revenues and devalued the currency, this alongside the heavy import duty helped to curtail the current account deficit (see import substitution). Pakistan's overall balance of payment's position improved significantly following record-high remittances in 2020, which stabilised the central bank's foreign exchange reserves. The fiscal deficit narrowed to less than 1% of GDP by 2020 due to the government's austerity policies.
Thus the rate of debt accumulation had significantly slowed, but Pakistan's debt remained high due to the high borrowing of previous governments in which the current government had to allocate $24 billion to pay off loans taken during the tenure of previous governments.

Aside from IMF-mandated reforms, Khan's government introduced policies to improve the business operating climate. As a result, Pakistan climbed 28 places higher on the World Bank's ease of doing business index. Pakistan ranked amongst the top 10 most improved countries in 2019. Pakistan's tax collection also hit record highs in 2019. As the government raised more revenue from domestic taxes with no increase in tax revenue from import taxes (given import compression had lowered the quantity being imported so the government collected less tax revenue from imports). This trend continued into 2020, albeit at a slower pace. The fiscal deficit was also controlled to less than 1% of GDP in the second half of 2020, Pakistan recorded a primary surplus (excluding interest payment and principal repayment of previous debt), but was in deficit once the interest payment on debt was accounted for, albeit the deficit was smaller. Economists primarily pinned this reduction in the fiscal deficit on an increase in non-tax revenues rather than an increase in tax revenues. For example, from the higher prices, consumers paid for oil from state-owned oil companies. Nevertheless, tax revenues also went on an upward trajectory with Pakistan's tax agency (FBR) both exceeding its tax collection target and collecting a record amount for the first quarter of the fiscal year 2021 in the calendar year 2020.

In economic policy with respect to international trade, from January 2020 Khan's government implemented the second phase of the China–Pakistan Free Trade Agreement these renegotiations with China led to concessionary rates by China on Pakistani exports of goods and services to mainland China such as reduced tariffs or zero tariffs. The negotiations were termed a "significant milestone" in the country's foreign policy by expanding trade relations in a relationship traditionally dominated by defence and security matters.

In June 2018 (before Khan's election as Prime Minister), the Financial Action Task Force (FATF) placed Pakistan on a grey list and demanded a series of actions be taken by Pakistan to remedy terror financing laws. Khan's government had initially used constitutional provisions of Presidential power held by Arif Alvi to issue ordinances (temporary legislation via Presidential decree) and the country became compliant with 14 points on the FATF agenda. Subsequently, a series of bills were presented in Pakistan's parliament to ensure the legislation would permanently remain in place beyond a temporary Presidential decree. Minor parts of the legislation passed both the lower house and upper house of Pakistan's parliament with the support of Khan's ruling coalition and part of the opposition parties too. However, the opposition-dominated Senate did not pass a significant portion of the FATF bills. Subsequently, Khan summoned a joint session of both upper and lower house of parliament in which the bills passed given the government held a majority and without the support of the opposition. By October 2020, Pakistan became successfully compliant on 21 out of 27 points on the FATF agenda, an increase from the 14 points in February 2020, with the remaining 6 points outstanding reviewed in February 2021. In FATF's February 2021 review, Khan's government had successfully implemented about 90% of the FATF agenda with 24 out of 27 points 'largely addressed' and the remaining 3 out of 27 points 'partially addressed'. The FATF President remarked that as Pakistan was progressing with its action plan so it "is not the time to put a country on the blacklist". In FATF's June 2021 review, the Khan government implemented more progress, the FATF found that Pakistan has now largely addressed 26 out of the 27 action items, US State Department spokesperson Ned Price praised Pakistan's progress but encouraged Pakistan to tackle its remaining action item saying "We do recognise and we support Pakistan's continued efforts to satisfy those (first action plan) obligations. Pakistan has made significant progress on its first action plan with 26 of 27 action items largely addressed — We encourage Pakistan to continue working with the FATF and the international community to swiftly complete the remaining action item by demonstrating that terrorism financing, investigations and prosecutions target senior leaders and commanders of UN-designated groups," he said. On 8 April 2022 the Khan government made progress on its remaining action plan by sentencing Hafiz Saeed a mastermind of the 2008 Mumbai attacks and a UN-designated terrorist to 31 years in prison.

Security and terrorism 
In national security policy, Khan's government presided over an improved overall security climate with foreign investors expressing greater confidence in the security of their investments in Pakistan.

On 5 March 2019, the Khan government formally banned the Hafiz Saeed-led Jamaat-ud-Dawa and its affiliate Falah-e-Insaniat Foundation under the Anti Terrorism Act 1997.

On 25 June 2020, Khan came under criticism, both in the international press and from the domestic opposition, for calling al-Qaeda founder and 9/11 mastermind Osama bin Laden a martyr. Khan, on a previous occasion during a local television interview, had refused to call bin Laden a terrorist.

In October 2020, Imran Khan spoke out about the growing extremism and violence against Muslims, across the world. In a letter posted on Twitter, he urged Facebook's CEO Mark Zuckerberg to ban Islamophobic content on its platform.

In July 2021, the Project Pegasus revealed a spyware surveillance list that included at least one number once used by Khan.

In 2019, Pakistan arrested Hafiz Saeed a mastermind of the 26/11 Mumbai attacks also a UN-designated terrorist, and on 8 April 2022 he was sentenced to 31 years in prison.

Social policy 
In social policy, Khan's government has taken steps to restore religious sites belonging to religious minorities  this included the Kartarpur Corridor. Khan's government took a significantly different position on the policy of minorities than the main opposition party, the PML-N, who had opposed the building of the corridor for Indian pilgrims.

Khan's government also instituted reforms to education and healthcare on a national and regional level respectively.

Khan's government introduced reforms to Pakistan's social safety net and the system of welfare in Pakistan more broadly. This included broadening welfare payments which was initially for widows only, to include the disabled as well as provide health insurance coverage.

In June 2021, Khan explained a surge of publicly known rape cases in Pakistan with what he called "common sense", namely that women who wear "very few clothes" will "have an impact on the men unless they are robots". His comments lead to outrage by female rights activists.

Environment and energy 
Khan pushed for an increase in renewable energy production and halted coal power from future construction working toward an aim to make Pakistan mostly renewable by 2030. In 2020, Khan's government commenced building work for the Diamer-Bhasha Dam, as part of his government's investment in renewable energy projects. The World Bank loaned Pakistan $450mn for investment in renewable energy projects as part of the government's stated aim of making Pakistan a renewable-energy reliant economy and reducing greenhouse gas emissions to combat climate change.

The government also introduced of an electric vehicle (EV) policy, the first in South Asia.

Further efforts to combat climate change consisted of re-foresting Pakistan with over 10 billion trees under the Plant for Pakistan project with the government on course to plant 3.3 billion trees in the first three and a half years of Khan's government, the reforestation programme includes an agreement with the UN Food and Agriculture Organisation (FAO), World Wildlife Fund (WWF) and others to independently monitor the projects in order to maintain transparency about funding. Khan also expanded national parks under a protected areas initiative.

Governance and anti-corruption 

Khan's government introduced reforms to Pakistan's bloated public sector. The public sector consisted of state-owned enterprises that were consistently making losses and accumulating debt for decades, including national services such as railways, airlines, postal services as well as other state-owned companies such as Pakistan's state-owned steel company. In 2019, Pakistan International Airlines reached breakeven in operating profit however the halt in air travel in the following year due to COVID-19 meant further reforms had to be made. This led to a proposal to cut the airline's workforce almost by half in order to save costs and thus help the state-owned airline breakeven on a net profit level in addition to the operating profit level. The national airline confirmed it would layoff employees in phases as part of PIA's restructuring plan in line with the government's policy of reversing the losses at state-owned companies. Khan's government is set to axe many PIA workers due to the fact that those appointments were politically motivated to reward loyalty to previous governments.

In 2019, Khan's government launched an anti-corruption campaign which was premised on the basis that no amnesty (known as NRO or National Reconciliation Ordinance in Pakistani political parlance) would be given to politicians or relatives who benefitted from a politician's patronage. The campaign has been criticised for targeting Khan's political opponents. Nevertheless, Khan's supporters argue that the campaign is genuine, as senior members of Khan's own ruling party, including Jahangir Khan Tareen and Aleem Khan, have faced investigation or prosecution, with Khan going as far as rejecting the formation of a "judicial commission" demanded by supporters of Tareen.

Under Khan's premiership, the performance of Pakistan's anti-corruption agency, the National Accountability Bureau improved significantly when measured in terms of recovery of money in cases involving plea bargains and/or convictions. The recovery of the anti-corruption agency had risen to Rs. 487 billion over three years from the start of 2018 to the beginning of 2021. This recovery was significantly higher than the anti-corruption agency's 10-year performance from 2008 to 2018 prior to Khan's government taking office.

COVID-19 pandemic 

During the COVID-19 pandemic, Khan's government rolled out the largest welfare programme in Pakistan's history, with a fund of almost $1 billion aimed at the country's poorest segment of the population. The PM's advisor Dr. Sania Nishtar confirmed that the programme would use pre-existing data of other welfare programmes under 'Ehsaas' system and the much smaller Benazir Income Support Programme which provided a more limited safety-net, while the Ehsaas programme targeted lower-income households more broadly. Following a drop in COVID-19 cases, declining positivity rates, and falling hospitalisations, Khan's government lifted lockdown restrictions. In a Gallup survey released in 2021, 7 out of 10 (or roughly 70%) of Pakistanis had a favourable view of the government's handling of the coronavirus pandemic. Economically, a V-shaped recovery was observed in both business confidence and expected employment index. The current account was in surplus for 3 out of 4 months after June 2020 although this was due to higher remittances (which tend to be volatile) offsetting decrease in exports. Fiscal prudence meant Pakistan's debt-to-GDP ratio remained broadly unchanged in 2021 according to the IMF, Pakistan defied the trend of rising debt, as most emerging/developing economies had witnessed a substantial rise in the debt-to-GDP ratio in order to deal with the pandemic with other developing countries seeing a 10% rise in debt-to-GDP on average. Furthermore, credit rating agency Fitch forecasted a fall in Pakistan's public debt to GDP ratio, reflecting lower debt incurred by the incumbent government and higher GDP growth in 2021.

In economic policy, Khan's government presided over a recovery in Pakistan's textile sector, with demand measured by the number of orders pending hitting historic highs. Khan's government facilitated the textile sector by offering concessionary rates on utilities such as electricity as well as reducing the electricity tariff during peak hours. Furthermore, the Asian Development Bank stated that it sees an "economic recovery" in Pakistan. Also, signs of recovery emerged as exports reached pre-covid levels towards the end of 2020. Following the recovery in the textile sector, export growth was almost in double-digits by February 2021, with a 9% growth in exports – especially value-added textile exports. In early 2021, Pakistan's apparel exports to the US had surged upwards in value and volume outperforming India and Bangladesh, both of which are the nearest regional economies similar to Pakistan's in South Asia. Khan's government facilitated the textile sector by removing all import tariffs on cotton yarn, in order to address a shortfall in the main raw material input of textiles and apparel. This policy of tax concessions was codified at least in the short term when Khan's government unveiled its budget for 2021–22 which had reduced customs duty on imports of inputs (raw materials) for final manufactured goods.

Foreign affairs 

In foreign policy, Khan voiced support for the 2019 Turkish offensive into north-eastern Syria against the Kurdish-led SDF. On 11 October 2019, Khan told the Turkish president Recep Tayyip Erdoğan that "Pakistan fully understands Turkey's concerns relating to terrorism". Khan's foreign policy towards neighbouring Afghanistan consists primarily of support for the Afghan peace process and also inaugurated a 24/7 border crossing with Afghanistan to facilitate travel and trade. He said that Pakistan will never recognize Israel until a Palestinian state is created, a statement in line with the vision of Pakistan's founder Muhammad Ali Jinnah.

According to the British newspaper The Independent, Khan's government had improved Pakistan's reputation abroad by stepping into its role as a 'world player'. In 2019, Khan was included in the Time 100, Time's annual list of the 100 most influential people in the world.

Khan also pursued a reset in ties with Gulf Arab states such as the United Arab Emirates and Saudi Arabia, with the UAE agreeing to roll over Pakistan's debt on an interest-free loan. Subsequently, Khan embarked on a three-day visit to the Kingdom of Saudi Arabia in order to reset ties, where he was personally received at the airport by Mohammad bin Salman. The ties had become tense previously due to the unwillingness of Pakistan to contribute militarily to the Saudi Arabian–led intervention in Yemen. Saudi Arabia's ambassador to Pakistan confirmed that the Saudi government had approved a concessionary loan for building a hydroelectric dam, the Mohmand dam. Khan's government also improved ties with the Gulf state of Kuwait, as Kuwait confirmed it had lifted a ten-year visa ban on Pakistani nationals. Khan's government enhanced economic ties with Qatar which is expected to benefit Pakistan by US$3 billion over 10 years by renegotiating terms in an energy supply deal which saw a significant reduction in Pakistan's energy import bill compared to the previous deal. Khan was mediating between Iran and Saudi Arabia in an effort to end the war in Yemen, which is part of an Iran–Saudi Arabia proxy conflict.

On 9 May 2021, Khan condemned the Israeli police actions at Al-Aqsa Mosque, stating that such actions violated "all norms of humanity and [international] law". Also, Khan has been vocal on the Kashmir issue, and his government adopted the foreign policy stance that no talks will be held with India on the Kashmir dispute until autonomy was restored in Indian-held Kashmir. Khan's national security adviser Moeed Yusuf confirmed that backdoor contacts with India (ostensibly brokered by the UAE) had broken down after India had refused to restore the region's autonomy.

In August 2021, Khan celebrated the departure of the United States from Afghanistan, describing it as Afghans breaking "the shackles of slavery".

Interests with Russian Federation 

After twenty-three years without a premiere of Pakistan visiting Moscow, Khan became the first such official of the century when he landed in the Russian capital on 23 February, for a two-day trip, where he planned to discuss "key issues of bilateral interest with top leadership," according to the Foreign Office of Pakistan. Nawaz Sharif, in March 1999, was the last to visit Moscow until then.

The meeting between the two heads of state was planned months in advance, and President Vladimir Putin met with Khan just hours after the Russian "special military operation" into the Donbas in an attack on neighboring Ukraine, during the second day of Khan's visit. Radio Pakistan reported the two discussed "economic and energy cooperation," namely, a several billion dollar Pakistan Stream Gas Pipeline project that Russian enterprise partnered in developing southward from Karachi to Punjab.

The pipeline, which began in 2020, is the result of a 2015 agreement for a 1,100 km pipeline with a designed capacity ranging from 12.4 to 16 billion cubic meters, with Russia financing 26% of costs, which ranged from US$1.5–3.5 billion. It was expected that even under sanctions against Russia Pakistan could still import up to 14 billion cubic meters of liquid natural gas (LNG) from the vast Russian reserves to the "energy-starved power plants" in Pakistan. The Eurasian Pipeline Consortium and pipeline supplier TMK were tasked with the completing the route.

Of the timing on the talks, Khan explained that he was invited by Putin months in advance, but furthermore that he was not interested in joining any "blocs" and welcomed neutrality, in hopes of "peace and harmony within and among societies."

Following the visit, Khan repeatedly refused submit to Western pressure calling for his condemnation Russia's invasion of Ukraine, at one point remarking "What do you think of us? Are we your slaves…that whatever you say, we will do?" During the UN General Assembly emergency meeting on the invasion he expressed regret for the situation while registering an abstention, and called for deescalation with adherence to international law as laid out in the UN Charter.

No confidence motion and removal from office 

After Khan disclosed to the public, in violation of state secret legislation, a diplomatic cable from the US urging action be taken to remove Khan in a coup on 8 March 2022, opposition parties submitted a motion of no confidence against him to the National Assembly's secretariat. On 1 April 2022, Prime Minister Khan announced that in context of the no-confidence motion against him in the National Assembly, the three options were discussed with "establishment" to choose from viz: "resignation, no-confidence [vote] or elections". On 3 April 2022, President Arif Alvi dissolved the National Assembly of Pakistan on Khan's advice, after the Deputy Speaker of the National Assembly rejected and set-aside the motion of no confidence; this move would have required elections to the National Assembly to be held within 90 days. On 10 April, after a Supreme Court ruling that the no-confidence motion was illegaly rejected, a no-confidence vote was conducted and he was ousted from office, becoming the first prime minister in Pakistan to be removed from office by a vote of no confidence. Khan claimed the US was behind his removal because he conducted an independent foreign policy and had friendly relations with China and Russia. His removal led to protests from his supporters across Pakistan.

Wealth 
He has a house in Zaman Park, Lahore worth . He is also owner of agriculture land of 39 kanals at Talhar, Islamabad, and 530 kanals at Khanewal. Further, he also has a share in 363 kanals of agricultural land which he inherited. However he has no vehicle registered in his name.

Khan owns a 300 kanal mansion in Bani Gala, Islamabad worth . Khan declared it as a gift in his statement to the Election Commission of Pakistan. The mansion is located within a gated enclosure and is accessible through a private driveway.

In November 2019, using FBR statements, Pakistani media revealed how much tax Khan had paid in 37 years. The documents released by the FBR also state that during this period he was exempted for some years from paying tax. On 3 January 2022, FBR released its 2019 tax directory for parliamentarians and it was revealed that Khan had paid 	 in taxes in 2019.

Public profile 
After the May 2013 elections, Mohammed Hanif writing for The Guardian termed Khan's support as appealing "to the educated middle classes but Pakistan's main problem is that there aren't enough educated urban middle-class citizens in the country". Pankaj Mishra writing for The New York Times in 2012, charactised Khan as a "cogent picture out of his—and Pakistan's—clashing identities" adding that "his identification with the suffering masses and his attacks on his affluent, English-speaking peers have long been mocked in the living rooms of Lahore and Karachi as the hypocritical ravings of "Im the Dim" and "Taliban Khan"—the two favored monikers for him." Mishra concluded with "like all populist politicians, Khan appears to offer something to everyone. Yet the great differences between his constituencies—socially liberal, upper-middle-class Pakistanis and the deeply conservative residents of Pakistan's tribal areas—seem irreconcilable."

On 18 March 2012, Salman Rushdie criticised Khan for refusing to attend the India Today Conference because of Rushdie's attendance. Khan cited the "immeasurable hurt" that Rushdie's writings have caused Muslims around the world. Rushdie, in turn, suggested that Khan was a "dictator in waiting." In 2011, While writing for The Washington Post, Richard Leiby termed Khan as an underdog adding that he "often sounds like a pro-democracy liberal but is well known for his coziness with conservative Islamist parties." Ayesha Siddiqa, in September 2014, writing for The Express Tribune, claimed that "while we can all sympathise with Khan's right to change the political tone, it would be worthwhile for him to envision how he would, if he did become the prime minister of this country, put the genie back into the bottle." H. M. Naqvi termed Khan as a "sort of a Ron Paul figure", adding that "there is no taint of corruption and there is his anti-establishment message."

During the 1970s, 1980s, and 1990s Khan was a popular sex symbol. He became known as a socialite in English high society, and sported a playboy image amongst the British press and paparazzi due to his "non-stop partying" at London nightclubs such as Annabel's and Tramp, though he claims to have hated English pubs and never drank alcohol. British heiress Sita White, daughter of Gordon White, Baron White of Hull, became the mother of his alleged lovechild daughter, Tyrian Jade White. A judge in the US ruled him to be the father of Tyrian due to his failure to appear in court, but Khan has denied paternity and asked for the case to be open in Pakistani courts. Later in 2007, Election Commission of Pakistan ruled in favour of Khan and dismissed the ex parte judgment of the US court, on grounds that it was neither admissible in evidence before any court or tribunal in Pakistan nor executable against him. About his lifestyle as a bachelor, he has often said that, "I never claim to have led an angelic life."

Declan Walsh in The Guardian newspaper in England in 2005 described Khan as a "miserable politician," observing that, "Khan's ideas and affiliations since entering politics in 1996 have swerved and skidded like a rickshaw in a rainshower... He preaches democracy one day but gives a vote to reactionary mullahs the next." Khan has also been accused by some opponents and critics of hypocrisy and opportunism, including what has been called his life's "playboy to puritan U-turn." Political commentator Najam Sethi, stated that, "A lot of the Imran Khan story is about backtracking on a lot of things he said earlier, which is why this doesn't inspire people." Author Fatima Bhutto has criticised Khan for "incredible coziness not with the military but with dictatorship" as well as some of his political decisions. Nevertheless, Khan's approval rating since he became Prime Minister remained comparatively robust for an officeholder in Pakistani politics with a majority approving (51%), compared to 46% disapproval and 3% undecided. Other polls suggested his approval was as high as 57%.

In popular culture 

During his cricketing days, Khan featured in many advertisements and television commercials as a celebrity brand endorser. These included Pepsi Pakistan, Brooke Bond, Thums Up (along with Sunil Gavaskar), and the Indian soap brand Cinthol, at a time when Bollywood legend Vinod Khanna was also endorsing the same product. His popularity in India was such that it was "unmatched in an era when there were no smartphones to take selfies. He was mobbed everywhere he went." The late veteran Bollywood actor Dev Anand even offered him a role in his sports action-thriller movie Awwal Number (1990), that of a cricket star in decline opposite an upcoming cricketer essayed by Aamir Khan, and as he refused, citing his lack of acting skills, the role eventually went to Aditya Pancholi. In 2010, a Pakistani production house produced a biographical film based on Khan's life, titled Kaptaan: The Making of a Legend. The title, which is Urdu for 'Captain', depicts Khan's captaincy and career with the Pakistan cricket team which led them to victory in the 1992 cricket world cup, as well as events which shaped his life; from being ridiculed in cricket to being labelled a playboy; from the death of his mother to his efforts and endeavours in building the first cancer hospital in Pakistan; from being the first Chancellor of the University of Bradford to the building of Namal University.

Canadian rock band Nickelback released a music video for its politically themed single Edge of a Revolution, featuring a short clip of a Pakistan Tehreek-e-Insaf (PTI) rally among other protests. The brief clip from the PTI rally shows red and green party flags along with a poster of PTI Chairman Imran Khan who was the most popular opposition leader.

Views on the Pashtuns and Afghans
In his virtual address at the 76th Session of the United Nations General Assembly on 24 September 2021, Khan remarked that many Pakistani Pashtuns "had strong sympathies with the Afghan Taliban, not because of their religious ideology, but because of Pashtun nationalism." His comments prompted outrage among many Pashtuns who called on him to apologise. Khan made similar comments also on 11 October, which triggered a protest in Peshawar the next day by the leftist Mazdoor Kisan Party (MKP). The Awami National Party (ANP) and the Pashtun Tahafuz Movement (PTM) also condemned Khan for "linking the Pashtuns with terrorists."

During his keynote address at the Organisation of Islamic Cooperation's (OIC) Extraordinary Session of Foreign Ministers on 19 December 2021, which was held in Islamabad to discuss the humanitarian situation in Afghanistan, Khan said not allowing girls to study was part of Afghan culture, and that the world should respect that. His remarks were criticised by many people from Afghanistan and Pakistan, including former Afghan President Hamid Karzai. Nobel laureate Malala Yousafzai also slammed Khan's remarks, saying "I nearly lost my life fighting against the Taliban's ban on girls' education."

Personal life 
He had numerous relationships during his bachelor life. He was then known as a hedonistic bachelor and a playboy who was active on the London nightclub circuit. Many girlfriends are unknown and were called "mysterious blondes" by British newspaper The Times. Some of the women he has been associated with include Zeenat Aman, Emma Sergeant, Susie Murray-Philipson, Sita White, Sarah Crawley, Stephanie Beacham, Goldie Hawn, Kristiane Backer, Susannah Constantine, Marie Helvin, Caroline Kellett, Liza Campbell, Anastasia Cooke, Hannah Mary Rothschild, and Lulu Blacker.

His first girlfriend, Emma Sergeant, an artist and the daughter of British investor Sir Patrick Sergeant, introduced him to socialites. They first met in 1982 and subsequently visited Pakistan. She accompanied him on various Pakistani cricket team tours including in Peshawar and Australian tour. After long separations, his relationship with Sergeant was broken in 1986. He then had a short relationship with Susie Murray-Philipson whom he invited to Pakistan and had dinner with in 1982. She also made various artistic portraits of Khan during their relationship.

In a book published in 2009, Christopher Sandford claimed that former Pakistani Prime Minister Benazir Bhutto and Imran Khan had a close relationship when both were students in Oxford. He wrote that Bhutto at the age of 21 first became close to Khan in 1975. They remained in a relationship for about two months. His mother also tried to have an arranged marriage between them. He further claimed that they had a "romantic relationship", which was refuted by Khan who said they were only friends.

Khan had a notable relationship with the heiress Sita White, daughter of the British industrialist Gordon White. They remained in the relationship for about six years having met in 1987–88. White claimed that Khan agreed to have a child with her in 1991; her daughter, Tyrian Jade, was born in June 1992 at Cedars-Sinai Medical Center in Los Angeles. White claimed that Khan subsequently refused to accept Tyrian as his child because she was a girl, and had urged White to have an abortion. Tyrian was noted for her resemblance to Khan. A court in Los Angeles ruled that Khan was the girl's father in 1997. In 2004, after Sita White's death, Khan agreed to accept Tyrian as his child and welcomed her into his family.

Khan's former wife, Reham Khan, alleged in her book that he had told her that he had four other children out of wedlock in addition to Tyrian White. Allegedly, some of his children had Indian mothers and the eldest was aged 34 in 2018. Reham subsequently conceded that she did not know the identities of Khan's children or the veracity of his statements and that "you can never make out whether he tells the truth." Reham's book was published on 12 July 2018, 13 days before the 2018 Pakistani general election, leading to claims that its publication was intended to damage Imran Khan's electoral prospects.

On 16 May 1995, Khan married Jemima Goldsmith, in a two-minute ceremony conducted in Urdu in Paris. A month later, on 21 June, they were married again in a civil ceremony at the Richmond registry office in England. Jemima converted to Islam upon marriage. The couple have two sons, Sulaiman Isa and Kasim. On 22 June 2004, it was announced that the couple had divorced, ending the nine-year marriage because it was "difficult for Jemima to adapt to life in Pakistan."

In January 2015, it was announced that Khan married British-Pakistani journalist Reham Khan in a private Nikah ceremony at his residence in Islamabad. However, Reham Khan later states in her autobiography that they in fact got married in October 2014 but the announcement only came in January the year after. On 22 October, they announced their intention to file for divorce.

In mid-2016, late 2017 and early 2018, reports emerged that Khan had married his spiritual mentor (murshid), Bushra Bibi. Khan, PTI aides and members of the Manika family denied the rumour. Khan termed the media "unethical" for spreading the rumour, and PTI filed a complaint against the news channels that had aired it. On 7 January 2018, however, the PTI central secretariat issued a statement that said Khan had proposed to Manika, but she had not yet accepted his proposal. On 18 February 2018, PTI confirmed Khan has married Manika. According to Khan, his life has been influenced by Sufism for three decades, and this is what drew him closer to his wife.

Khan resides in his sprawling farmhouse at Bani Gala. In November 2009, Khan underwent emergency surgery at Lahore's Shaukat Khanum Cancer Hospital to remove an obstruction in his small intestine.

As of 2018, he owned five pet dogs, who resided in his estate.

On 20 March 2021, Khan tested positive for COVID-19. He had received his first dose of the Sinopharm BIBP vaccine two days earlier. The Ministry of National Health Services clarified that, as he contracted the disease only two days after receiving his first of two doses of the vaccine, that he was not considered "fully vaccinated" against COVID-19.

Awards and honours

Literary work 
Khan has published six works of non-fiction, including an autobiography co-written with Patrick Murphy. He has also written about the modern history of Pakistan in his book Main Aur Mera Pakistan published in 2014 in Urdu and Hindi. The book contains details about Pakistan's wars with India in 1965 and 1971, the impact of 1979 Iranian Revolution and capture of terrorist Osama bin Laden at Abbottabad in 2011. He periodically writes editorials on cricket and Pakistani politics in several leading Pakistani and British newspapers. It was revealed in 2008 that Khan's second book, Indus Journey: A Personal View of Pakistan, had required heavy editing from the publisher.  The publisher Jeremy Lewis revealed in a memoir that when he asked Khan to show his writing for publication, "He handed me a leather-bound notebook or diary containing a few jottings and autobiographical snippets. It took me, at most, five minutes to read them; and that, it soon became apparent, was all we had to go on." Khan's most recent book was published in 2011, an autobiography about his transition from cricketer to politician, as well as the challenges he faced in his philanthropic work.

Khan has also penned op-eds in various media outlets, including CNN where he advocated for conversation and restoration of damaged natural ecosystems.

Bibliography

2022 Toshakhana reference case 

The Pakistan Democratic Movement's MNAs brought the Toshakhana case against Imran Khan in August 2022 because he failed to disclose the specifics of the Toshakhana presents in his yearly asset report to the Election Commission of Pakistan. The investigation was started by the ECP, which then made its final determination on 21 October 2022, disqualifying Imran from holding public office for a brief period of time for engaging in dishonest behavior, fabricating information, and making an inaccurate declaration in the reference under Article 63(1)(p) of the constitution of Pakistan.

Assassination attempt 

On 3 November 2022, Khan was shot in the leg or in the foot by a gunman while giving a speech to supporters at a rally in Wazirabad, Punjab, and leading a march to the capital Islamabad to demand snap elections after he was ousted. Automatic gunfire was heard in footage aired on local news channels which also showed Khan being carried away and put in a car, with a bandage visible on his leg. Khan's conditions were not described as critical. A PTI party's supporter was killed during the shooting, and eight other people were also wounded. The perpetrator was arrested at the scene and claimed that he wanted only to target Khan for "spreading hatred and misleading the people".

Possible arrest operation 

As a result of an arrest warrant issued by the district and sessions court in Islamabad, Islamabad Police and Lahore Police started operation to potentially arrest the former prime minister Imran Khan on March 14th, 2023.

See also 

 Family of Imran Khan
 Goldschmidt family
 Pets of Imran Khan
 List of international cricket five-wicket hauls by Imran Khan
 Player of the Match awards (cricket)
 List of sportsperson-politicians
 KP Sharma Oli

References

Bibliography

External links

  (English)
  (Arabic)
 
 Column archive at The Guardian
 Imran Khan's journey from cricketing Playboy to Politician – Journeyman Pictures
 1990s Interview, Cricketer Imran Khan at Home – thekinolibrary
 

 
1952 births
Living people
Prime Ministers of Pakistan
Pakistan International Airlines cricketers
Pakistan One Day International cricketers
Pakistani cricket captains
Pakistan Tehreek-e-Insaf MNAs
Pakistan Test cricket captains
Pakistan Test cricketers
Pakistani expatriates in England
Pakistani autobiographers
Pakistani cricket commentators
Pakistani Muslims
Pakistani nationalists
Pakistani pacifists
Pakistani philanthropists
Pakistani socialites
Pakistani sportsperson-politicians
Pakistani Sufis
Pakistani political party founders
Pakistani prisoners and detainees
Pakistani MNAs 2002–2007
Pakistani MNAs 2013–2018
Pakistani MNAs 2018–2023
Pakistani anti-corruption activists
Aitchison College alumni
Alumni of Keble College, Oxford
Articles containing video clips
British Universities cricketers
Chancellors of the University of Bradford
Charity fundraisers (people)
Cricketers at the 1975 Cricket World Cup
Cricketers at the 1979 Cricket World Cup
Cricketers at the 1983 Cricket World Cup
Cricketers at the 1987 Cricket World Cup
Cricketers at the 1992 Cricket World Cup
Dawood Industries cricketers
Fellows of Keble College, Oxford
Fellows of the Royal College of Physicians of Edinburgh
Goldsmith family
Lahore A cricketers
Lahore City cricketers
Lahore cricketers
Lahore Greens cricketers
Leaders of political parties in Pakistan
New South Wales cricketers
Oxford and Cambridge Universities cricketers
Oxford University cricketers
Pashtun people
People educated at the Royal Grammar School Worcester
People from Islamabad
People from Mianwali District
Politicians from Lahore
Recipients of Hilal-i-Imtiaz
Recipients of the Pride of Performance
Sussex cricketers
Wisden Cricketers of the Year
Wisden Leading Cricketers in the World
Worcestershire cricketers
World Series Cricket players
M Parkinson's World XI cricketers
Pakistani cricket coaches
Niazi family
Cricketers from Mianwali